Miamira is a genus of colourful sea slugs, specifically dorid nudibranchs, shell-less marine gastropod mollusks in the family Chromodorididae.

Species 
This genus includes the following species:

Species brought into synonymy  
 Miamira nobilis Bergh, 1875: synonym of  Miamira sinuata (van Hasselt, 1824)

References

Chromodorididae
Gastropod genera